The Temasya LRT station is a light rapid transit (LRT) station under planning that will serve the suburbs of Temasya and Glenmarie in Selangor, Malaysia. It serves as one of the stations on the Shah Alam Line. The station is located at Persiaran Kerjaya, Glenmarie near a junctions of Jalan Pengaturcaraan.

Surrounding Developments
Major landmarks and developments in the vicinity of this Station:
 Persiaran Kerjaya
 Temasya Suria commercial district
 Temasya Suria Glenmarie Residence
 Masjid An Nur Temasya Glenmarie

External links
 Temasya LRT Station - mrt.com.my
 LRT3 Bandar Utama–Klang line

Rapid transit stations in Selangor
Shah Alam Line